The New Zealand lanternshark (Etmopterus baxteri) is a shark of the family Etmopteridae found off New Zealand. Some taxonomic authorities consider it to be conspecific with the southern lanternshark.

References

Etmopterus
Fish described in 1957
Taxa named by Jack Garrick